Robert Taylor is a self-taught artist from Oklahoma whose paintings explore Native American subject matter. He uses symbolism and manipulates figures' proportions, particularly hands and feet.

Early life
Robert Taylor was born in Tulsa, Oklahoma, in 1951 and lived there his entire life, other than his time in the Navy starting in 1970. Taylor has claimed Blackfoot, Cherokee, Osage, and Black Dutch ancestry; however, he is not American Indian. His maternal grandfather exposed him to Native American cultures by taking him to powwows and his maternal uncle was a well-known wildlife painter. 

Taylor graduated from Will Rogers High School in 1969, where he played baseball and football. He went on a sports scholarship to Central Missouri State in Warrensburg, Missouri, for a short time until he was injured during the first semester. He dropped out of Central Missouri State to transfer to the University of Tulsa but was drafted before he completed the move. Taylor was in the Navy from 1970 to 1972. 
After he got out of the Navy, Taylor began pursuing art. He began with a more traditional style but was influenced by an exhibition of Paul Pletka's work as well as John Bigger.

Style
Taylor's style is heavily influenced by that of Paul Pletka. Taylor used universal symbols in his paintings that express similar thoughts from various religious traditions. He also intentionally exaggerates the proportions of hands and feet in his paintings of turn-of-the-century Indians. The enlarged hands symbolize dexterous minds as well as the elevation of the human species among all others. Enlarged feet symbolize that we are bound to the earth physically while our dreams and aspirations are spiritual. He works primarily with watercolors, acrylics, pen and ink, and prints.

Taylor's definition of art is open-ended. He considers himself "a doormaker." If he "decorate[s] the door right, someone will stop and open it. Where it leads them is what art is, not what [he] constructed."

Exhibitions and awards
Some of the numerous shows in which Taylor has exhibited and won awards for his work include:
 Trail of Tears Art Show at the Cherokee National Museum
 Five Civilized Tribes Museum
 Gallup Inter-Tribal Indian Ceremonial
 Trail of Tears State Park Gallery 
 Los Angeles International Contemporary Art Fair
 Red Earth Festival
 International Art Festival
 Smithsonian Institution

His artwork is also featured in numerous public and private art collections.

References

External links
Oklahoma Native Artists Oral History Project, OSU Library

1951 births
American people of Blackfoot descent
American people of Cherokee descent
American people of Osage descent
Living people
Painters from Oklahoma